Denise Augusta Marguerite Legeay (22 January 1898 – 27 May 1968) was a French film actress whose popularity peaked during the silent film era of the 1920s.

Legeay made her film debut at age 23 in the 1921 Henry Houry directed film L’infante à la rose and would continue to act in films until 1926, including a ten episode film serial Vingt ans après in 1922.

Selected filmography
Happy Couple (1923)
The Man Without Nerves (1924)
 Swifter Than Death (1925)
Zigano (1925)
Eyes Open, Harry! (1926)

References

External links

Le Cinema Francais

1898 births
1968 deaths
French film actresses
French silent film actresses
People from Sarthe
20th-century French actresses